Rogelio Rodriguez (born 11 March 1976) is a former Mexican footballer.

He joined Pumas for the Apertura 2007 tournament, on a loan from his club Tigres UANL. Rodriguez has played most of his career with Tigres.

He left Pumas and joined Correcaminos UAT for the Apertura 2008–09 season.

References

External links

1976 births
Living people
Mexican footballers
Tigres UANL footballers
Correcaminos UAT footballers
Association football goalkeepers